Bandar or Bunder may refer to:

Places 
 Bandar, Afghanistan
 Bandar, Narayanganj, Bangladesh
 Bandar, Isfahan, Iran
 Bandar, Kermanshah, Iran
 Bandar, Yazd, Iran
 Banda Aceh, Indonesia
 Bandar Lampung, Indonesia
 Bandar Seri Begawan, Brunei
Machilipatnam, India, alternative name

Persons

Given name
 Bandar Al Hajjar (born 1953), Saudi Arabian economist 
 Bandar bin Talal Al Rashid, one of the emirs of Jabal Shammar
 Bandar bin Abdulaziz Al Saud, a former senior prince in Saudi Arabia
 Bandar bin Faisal Al Saud, a former Saudi royal
 Bandar bin Khalid Al Saud, Saudi businessman
 Bandar bin Sultan Al Saud, former Saudi ambassador to the USA

Surname
 Awad Hamed al-Bandar, Iraqi chief judge under Saddam Hussein's presidency

Father name
 Faisal bin Bandar Al Saud, Saudi prince, governor of Riyadh Region
 Faisal bin Bandar Al Saud, Saudi businessman and government official
 Khalid bin Bandar Al Saud, Saudi ambassador to the UK
 Khalid bin Bandar Al Saud, former president of the General Intelligence and former governor of the Riyadh Province
 Reema bint Bandar Al Saud, Saudi ambassador to the USA

Other uses
 Bandar (port), a Persian word
 Bandar tribe, in the comic series The Phantom
 Bandar, a fictional Middle-Eastern country with a Persian-speaking population, in the fifth season of the TV series Scandal
 Bandar (beetle), a genus of long-horned beetles in the subfamily Prioninae

See also
 Banda (disambiguation)
 Bandar-log, a term in Rudyard Kipling's novel The Jungle Book
 Bandar-e Mahshahr, city in Iran
 Bandari (disambiguation)
 Bandor (disambiguation)
 Bandra, a suburb of West Mumbai in the state of Maharashtra, India
 Bondar (disambiguation)